Love Club was an American goth band.

Love Club may also refer to:
The Love Club EP, a 2013 extended play by Lorde
"The Love Club" (song), by Lorde
"Love Club", a song by Big Bang from Big Bang (2009 album)